Ali Hassan Khalil (born 15 July 1964) is a Lebanese politician, Member of Parliament, and former Minister of Finance. 

Khalil is described as the "second most powerful man" in Amal behind Parliament Speaker Nabih Berri. He was sanctioned by the United States Treasury under the Magnitsky Act over "corruption" and "leveraging political power for financial gain".

Career
Khalil, who studied law at the Lebanese University, is a member of parliament representing the Marjeyoun/Hasbaya district. He ran successfully in 1996, 2000, 2005, 2009, and 2018.

Khalil was appointed minister of public health in the cabinet of Najib Mikati on 13 June 2011. Khalil's term ended when he was appointed minister of finance, replacing Mohammad Safadi in the post.

He was appointed minister of finance on three occasions: February 2014 under PM Tammam Salam, December 2016 and January 2020 under PM Saad Hariri.

See also
 Members of the 2009–2013 Lebanese Parliament
 Amal Movement

References 

1964 births
Living people
Members of the Parliament of Lebanon
Amal Movement politicians
Finance ministers of Lebanon
People from Marjeyoun District
Lebanese University alumni